The 2017 Missouri Valley Conference baseball tournament will be held from May 24 through 27. All eight baseball-sponsoring schools in the conference will participate in the double-elimination tournament to be held at Missouri State's Hammons Field in Springfield, Missouri. The winner of the tournament will earn the conference's automatic bid to the 2017 NCAA Division I baseball tournament.

Seeding and format
The league's eight teams will be seeded based on conference winning percentage. The teams will play a two bracket, double-elimination format tournament, with the winner of each bracket then playing a single elimination final.

Results

References

Tournament
Missouri Valley Conference Baseball Tournament
Missouri Valley Conference baseball tournament
Missouri Valley Conference baseball tournament